Carlos Eduardo Bouças Dolabella Filho (born July 20, 1980), best known as Dado Dolabella, is a Brazilian actor and singer. In 2016 he became an advocate for the vegan lifestyle.

Biography
Dolabella was born in Rio de Janeiro, the son of the Brazilian actor Carlos Eduardo Dolabella and the Spanish-born actress Pepita Rodríguez.

Career

Television
 2008 - Chamas da Vida .... Antônio Galvão Ferreira
 2006 - Cristal .... João Pedro Ascânio
 2004 - Senhora do Destino .... Plínio Ferreira da Silva
 2003 - A Casa das Sete Mulheres .... Bento "Bentinho" Filho
 2003 - Sexo Frágil .... Gerônimo
 2001 - Malhação .... Robson Silveira Sampaio

Filmography
 2008 - Wink .... Marcos
 2005 - Gaijin - Ama-me Como Sou .... Brother

Discography
 2003 - Dado pra Você
 2004 - Mais do Mesmo
 2009 - Relax

Tv Series
 2008 - Louca Família
 2009 - A Fazenda 1

References

External links

 
 

1980 births
Living people
Brazilian male film actors
21st-century Brazilian male singers
21st-century Brazilian singers
Brazilian male telenovela actors
Brazilian people of Spanish descent
The Farm (TV series) winners
Male actors from Rio de Janeiro (city)
Farm, The